Robert George Everitt Murray  (19 May 1919, Ruislip, West London, England – 18 February 2022, London, Ontario, Canada) was an English-Canadian bacteriologist. He is known for his research on bacterial structure and pathology, as well as bacterial taxonomy.

Biography
His father was Everitt George Dunne Murray (1890–1964), who was a professor of bacteriology at Montreal's McGill University from 1930 to 1955. After his childhood years in England and attending boarding school at Summer Fields in Oxford, R. G. E. Murray moved with his family in 1930 to Montreal. He studied at McGill University from 1936 to 1938. He returned to England and graduated from Christ's College, Cambridge in 1941 with a B.A. in pathology and bacteriology.

In 1941 R. G. E. Murray was accepted as a medical student at McGill University. In late October 1941 he embarked upon a 3-week voyage in convoy to Canada. He graduated from McGill University in late 1943 with an M.D. and completed his medical internship in 1944, at the Royal Victoria Hospital, Montreal. In 1944 he married Dorothy Marchand, whom he met in 1938, in Salisbury Cove, Maine at a summer course in invertebrate zoology. For less than a year from 1944 to 1945, he served as a captain in the Royal Canadian Army Medical Corps.

In the department of bacteriology and immunology of the University of Western Ontario Medical School (now part of the Schulich School of Medicine & Dentistry), he became a lecturer in 1945 and was promoted to full professor in 1949. From 1949 to 1974 he was head of the department. As head, he introduced electron microscopy into the department in 1954 and enabled the department to gain an international reputation in bacterial research. He retired as professor emeritus in 1984. From 1948 to 1965 he was chief of the microbiology service of Victoria Hospital in London, Ontario.

Murray chaired from 1951 to 1952 the founding committee for the Canadian Society of Microbiologists and from 1951 to 1952 served as the founding president of the society. From 1954 to 1960 he was the founding editor of the Canadian Journal of Microbiology. For the academic year 1972–1973 he was the president of the American Society for Microbiology. From  1991 to 1994 he was the editor-in-chief of the International Journal of Systematic Bacteriology.

His father, E. G. D. Murray, was from 1936 to 1964 a member of the board of trustees of  Bergey's Manual. After his father's death in 1964, R. G. E. Murray joined the board of trustees and chaired the board from 1976 to 1990.
 
R. G. E. Murray was among the first bacteriologists to advocate that prokaryotes should be "given the rank of superkingdom".
 He gained an international reputation for his research in bacteriology, including the cytology, structure, function, systematics, and taxonomy of bacteria. He used electron microscopy and biochemical analysis to elucidate bacterial structures, notably S-layers in various bacterial species.

He was elected in 1957 a Fellow of the Royal Society of Canada (RSC). He received in 1984 the RSC's Flavelle Medal. The Canadian Journal of Microbiology dedicated the April 1988 issue to Murray in recognition of his scientific contributions. He was awarded in 1994 the Bergey Medal for bacterial taxonomy by the board of trustees of Bergey's Manual. He was appointed an Officer of the Order of Canada in 1998. He received honorary D.Sc. degrees from four universities.

Murray's first wife, Dorothy née Marchand, predeceased him after 40 years of marriage. They had two sons and a daughter. Murray was also predeceased by his second wife, Marion née Luney, after 28 years of marriage. He was predeceased by one of his two sons. He was survived by a son, a daughter, six grandchildren, and two great-grandchildren.

Eponynms
 Robertmurraya, genus in the family Bacillaceae
 Deinococcus murrayi, an extremely radiation-resistant bacterial species

Selected publications

References

1919 births
2022 deaths
English centenarians
Canadian centenarians
English bacteriologists
English microbiologists
Canadian microbiologists
20th-century English medical doctors
Canadian physicians
People educated at Summer Fields School
McGill University alumni
Alumni of Christ's College, Cambridge
Academic staff of the University of Western Ontario
Fellows of the Royal Society of Canada
Officers of the Order of Canada
Men centenarians